The Oxford Circus panic or Oxford Street panic was a human stampede in Oxford Circus tube station and surrounding streets in London, United Kingdom, around 16:38 GMT on Friday 24 November 2017, in which 16 people were injured. The incident began with false reports of gunshots after a fight between two people on the Central line platform at Oxford Circus station. The panic coincided with Black Friday sales and the Christmas shopping season, and the streets of Oxford Street and Regent Street were full of shoppers. Many shops barricaded their doors, and the police issued warnings for people in Oxford Street to seek shelter immediately. In the resulting panic, several people were injured by falls and trampling, nine seriously enough to require hospital treatment. By 18:05 GMT, the police declared that there had been no gunshots or terrorism, and ended the incident.

Background
London had seen several terrorist attacks in 2017, including vehicle ramming attacks on Westminster Bridge in March and London Bridge in June, and an attempted train bombing in September. The terror threat level was "Severe" meaning that an attack was considered highly likely.

Oxford Street and Regent Street are two of the UK's busiest shopping streets, and the incident occurred on one of the busiest shopping days of the year.

Ten days prior to the incident, a window cleaner was injured in a fall from a building on Oxford Street onto a lorry parked beneath. A Twitter post about this accident describing a lorry surrounded by blood stains would later be taken out of context during the panic as evidence of a non-existent vehicle attack.

Incident
At 16:38 GMT, there was an altercation between two men on the westbound Central line platform at Oxford Circus station, with some witnesses reporting hearing bangs. People began to flee the station from an exit at the junction between Oxford Street and Regent Street. Seeing this rush, others on the street, including passengers on passing buses, began to panic and ran away through the streets and into nearby shops and restaurants. In the resulting stampede, 16 people were injured, including eight people who needed hospital treatment for minor injuries and one who suffered serious leg trauma.

The Metropolitan Police and British Transport Police responded with armed police and closed Oxford Circus station as well as nearby Bond Street station. The London Fire Brigade sent several fire engines to respond to the incident. In a tweet, Metropolitan Police told those in buildings to stay inside and those on Oxford Street to seek shelter. Police went from building to building searching for shooters. At 18:05 GMT, the police declared that there was no evidence of any gun shots and ended the state of emergency, although extra officers remained on the scene to reassure those caught up in the incident.

Media reporting and mass panic

After the first reports of apparent gunfire in Oxford Circus, news about an apparent terrorist attack spread rapidly, fuelled by both news media stories and social media postings. These posts are believed to have worsened the panic and caused it to spread further around the Oxford Circus area.

Pop star Olly Murs, who had been in Selfridges Oxford Street store at the time, was particularly criticised for tweeting to 7.8 million followers "Fuck everyone get out of Selfridges now gun shots!! I'm inside." Despite not hearing any gunfire or seeing any evidence of a terrorist attack, Murs continued to claim that there had been a shooting in Selfridges for months following the incident.

Aftermath
The Metropolitan Police issued CCTV footage of two people wanted for questioning for the initial altercation. Two men aged 21 and 40 handed themselves in to police the next day. They were released without charge, with the Metropolitan Police declaring that they were not searching for any further suspects.

The incident has become a case study of mass delusions, the spread of misinformation on social media, and the need for clear information during serious incidents.

References

Mass psychogenic illness
November 2017 events in the United Kingdom
2010s in the City of Westminster
Oxford Street
Human stampedes in the United Kingdom
Human stampedes in 2017